= Navalgatti =

Coordinates: 15°49′N 74°42′E

- Village
- Interactive map of Navalgatti
- Country: India
- State: Karnataka
- District: Belgaum

Languages
  - Official: Kannada
- Time zone: UTC+5:30 (IST)

Navalgatti is a village in Belgaum district of Karnataka, India.
